Steve Tjeenao (born 19 January 1980) is a retired Namibian football defender.

References

1980 births
Living people
Namibian men's footballers
Namibia international footballers
Chief Santos players
African Stars F.C. players
Association football defenders